Debbie Purdy (4 May 1963 – 23 December 2014) was a British music journalist and political activist from Bradford, West Yorkshire,  with primary progressive multiple sclerosis, notable for her challenge to the law in England and Wales as relates to assisted suicide. On 20 September 2009, it was announced that guidelines on assisted suicide law would be published by the UK Government. The guidelines for England and Wales "come after a legal battle won by Debbie Purdy", as "Law Lords accepted earlier this year that [Purdy] had a right to know whether her husband would be prosecuted if he helped her to travel abroad to commit suicide."

Purdy's case
Debbie Purdy and her counsel David Pannick QC argued that the Director of Public Prosecutions (Ken Macdonald QC) was infringing on her human rights by failing to clarify how the Suicide Act 1961 is enforced. The DPP counsel took the position that the law does not require the DPP to make any further clarification of the Act: they argue that the Act and further information contained in the Code for Crown Prosecutors provide sufficient information.

Purdy's particular concern was to discover if any actions her husband, Omar Puente, took in assisting her suicide would lead to his prosecution. The penalty for those who "aid, abet, counsel or procure the suicide of another" is a maximum of 14 years. No family member of the 92 Britons who have gone abroad for an assisted suicide has been prosecuted but some have been charged and have had to wait for months before hearing the charges have been dropped. Purdy said that if her husband would be exposed to prosecution for helping her travel to Switzerland to a Dignitas clinic to die, she would make the journey sooner whilst she was able to travel unassisted. This would save her husband from exposure to the law but would have forced Purdy to make her decision on dying before she felt it was absolutely necessary.

The hearing began on 2 October 2008 and was complete soon after. The venue was the High Court of Justice. It proceeded before Lord Justice  Scott Baker and Mr Justice Aikens. In court the DPP said that Purdy could not be given any reassurance that her husband would not be prosecuted as the law was clear that assisting suicide is an offence.

On 10 December 2008 Sky TV broadcast a programme on which a man with motor neurone disease was shown committing suicide with assistance. There had also been the UK case of a Mr James who went to Switzerland with the aid of his parents after being paralysed whilst playing rugby and the Department of Public Prosecutions determined that to prosecute the parents would be against the public interest. These two events led to the issue of assisted suicide making the first story on the BBC's Newsnight. Purdy appeared to debate the issue and denied that it is society that makes disabled people wish to kill themselves and reasserted her belief that it is right to be able to seek assistance when one is physically incapable of committing suicide oneself.

Personal life
Purdy met her husband Omar Puente in Singapore when he was playing with a band, and they married in 1998. She was diagnosed with multiple sclerosis after she found her feet felt heavy when out dancing. She later used a wheelchair for mobility and both her sight and hearing began to deteriorate. Purdy entered the Marie Curie Hospice in Bradford in June 2013 and in December 2013 she began to intermittently refuse food. She described the length of time it was taking to die as "agonising". Purdy died on 23 December 2014, aged 51.

Book and radio play
Purdy published her story as It's Not Because I Want to Die (2010,).

On 26 February 2019 BBC Radio 4 broadcast Joy Wilkinson's dramatisation of Purdy's book, as Test case: Debbie Purdy. It was followed by a discussion, Test Case: The Legacy of Debbie Purdy, between professor Deborah Bowman, Purdy's husband Omar Puente, her lawyer Saimo Chahal QC, and barrister and peer Charlie Falconer.

See also
Assisted suicide in the United Kingdom
Euthanasia
Diane Pretty

References

1963 births
2014 deaths
British music journalists
British women activists
Euthanasia activists
Euthanasia in the United Kingdom
People from Bradford
People with multiple sclerosis
Suicides by starvation